Botafogo de Futebol e Regatas (Botafogo Football and Rowing), also known as Botafogo, is a Brazilian sports club based in the bairro (neighborhood) of Botafogo, in the city of Rio de Janeiro. Although they compete in a number of different sports, Botafogo is mostly known for its association football team. It plays in the Campeonato Brasileiro Série A, the top tier of the Brazilian football league system, and in the state of Rio de Janeiro's premier state league. In 2000, Botafogo finished 12th in a vote by subscribers of FIFA Magazine for the FIFA Club of the Century.

In addition, the club has some of Brazilian football's most notable records, as the most unbeaten matches: 52 games between 1977 and 1978; the most unbeaten matches record in the Brazilian Championship games: 42, also between 1977 and 1978; the most player participations in total matches of the Brazil national football team (considering official and unofficial games): 1,094 participations and the most players assigned to the Brazil national team for World Cup. The club holds the record for the greatest victory ever recorded in Brazilian football: 24–0 against Sport Club Mangueira in 1909.

History

Formation and merger
On July 1, 1894, Club de Regatas Botafogo was founded.

On 12 August 1904, another club was founded in the neighborhood: the Electro Club, the name first given to the Botafogo Football Club. The idea came during an algebra lesson at Alfredo Gomes College, when Flávio Ramos wrote to his friend Emmanuel Sodré: "Itamar has a football club in Martins Ferreira Street. Let's establish another one, in Largo dos Leões, what do you think? We can speak to the Wernecks, to Arthur César, Vicente and Jacques". The Electro Club was founded, but its name did not last. After a suggestion from Dona Chiquitota, Flávio's grandmother, the club finally became the Botafogo Football Club, on September 18 of the same year. The colors were black and white like those of Juventus FC, the team of Itamar Tavares, one of the club's founders. Its badge was drawn by Basílio Vianna Jr., in Swiss style with the BFC monogram. The Botafogo Football Club would soon become one of the strongest football teams in Rio de Janeiro, winning the championships of 1907, 1910, 1912 and more.

With the same name, the same location, the same colours and most important the same supporters, it seemed inevitable that the clubs would merge. They did so on 8 December1942, after a basketball match between both clubs, when Botafogo Football Club player Armando Albano died suddenly, that the idea of a merger began. On this tragic occasion, the president of Club de Regatas Botafogo,  (also a major Brazilian poet), spoke: "At this time, I declare to Albano that his last match ended with the victory of his team. We won't play the time left on the clock. We all want the young fighter to leave this great night as a winner. This is how we salute him." Eduardo Góis Trindade, Botafogo Football Club's president said: "Between the matches of our clubs, only one can be the winner: Botafogo!." And then Schmidt declared the fusion: "What else do we need for our clubs to become one?." Botafogo de Futebol e Regatas finally came into being. The Football Club's badge became black, and the monogram substituted by Clube de Regatas' lone star.

On the field

The team won the Campeonato Carioca in 1907, 1910 and 1912. In 1909 the team beat Mangueira 24–0, which remains the highest score in Brazilian football.
They won further state titles in 1930, 1932, 1933, 1934 and 1935.

In the 1940s, after the creation of Botafogo de Futebol e Regatas, the team's best player was Heleno de Freitas. However, Heleno did not win a championship for Botafogo. He scored 204 goals in 233 matches, but went to the Boca Juniors in 1948, the year Botafogo won its 9th state championship.

They won the Campeonato Carioca in 1957, 1961 and 1962, and in 1968 they won Serie A, becoming the first carioca club to win the Brazilian league.

1989 ended a period of 21 years without a title when the club won the state championship, retaining the trophy in 1990.

In the 1990s, Botafogo won Copa Conmebol (the precursor of the current Copa Sudamericana). And in 1995 they won the Brazilian League for the second time in club's history, after drawing 1–1 the second leg of the Final against Santos FC at São Paulo.

Botafogo would be relegated to the Second Division after ranking last in the Brazilian League of 2002. In 2003, Botafogo ranked second in Brazil's Second division (after Palmeiras) and returned to the First Division.

In 2006, the club won the Rio de Janeiro State Championship for the 18th time, and again in 2010 and 2013 with the iconic players Loco Abreu and Seedorf, respectively.

In the 2020 edition of the Série A, Botafogo performed poorly and ended the championship in the last position, causing the club's relegation to the Série B for their third time in history.

Nowadays, Botafogo is the only club to have won titles in three different centuries, including the state championship for rowing in 1899.

The SAF Era

Beginning in 2020, Botafogo underwent a series of internal audits to spin off its football division as a for-profit corporate entity, owned by the club, but which could be portioned and sold to investors. This was due to unprecedented legislation allowing for football clubs to be operated as corporations, and would be a solution to the severe financial crisis the club had faced for decades. Relegation to the Série B, however, delayed these plans.

The year 2021 saw Botafogo's debt reach one billion real. They placed 6th in the Rio de Janeiro State Championship, after a penalty decision lost to the also relegated Vasco da Gama. The club was off to a middling start to the Série B season, but bounced back after the hiring of manager Enderson Moreira, who was able to bring Botafogo back to the top tier of Brazilian football, as champions of the 2021 edition of Série B. It was Botafogo's second Série B title.

Meanwhile, the incoming administration had begun internal restructuring, hiring executive Jorge Braga for the brand-new post of CEO and downsizing its workforce considerably. Botafogo entered into a partnership with the investment firm XP Inc. to seek out potential buyers for its football division, which was in the process of becoming its own corporate entity. Congress had recently passed the Sociedade Anônima de Futebol (SAF) law, allowing foreigners to purchase shares in Brazilian football clubs for the first time in history.

Having averted complete financial disaster by returning to Série A, the country's top competitive tier, Botafogo finalized its transition into the SAF legal structure. The social club remained as an entity, owning 100% of Botafogo SAF's shares. In January 2022, it came to light that American investor John Textor, owner of a majority stake in Premier League club Crystal Palace F.C., was in talks to purchase a majority share of Botafogo. In February 2022, the club announced the acquisition of 90% of the shares of Botafogo's football division by Textor's holding company Eagle Holdings, and the start of a new era for the club.

Stadium

The team's home ground is the Estádio Olímpico Nilton Santos, named in honor of Nilton Santos, a former club player and two time world champion with the Brazil National Football Team, and some feel the greatest left back of all time,  .

Other stadiums used by the club during its history are:
Voluntários da Pátria Street Field, the club's first pitch at their neighborhood of origin.
Estádio General Severiano, the club's first own stadium.
Marechal Hermes Stadium, less important matches during 1978–1986.
Estádio Caio Martins, at the neighboring city of Niterói.
Estádio Luso Brasileiro during the 2005 and 2016 seasons.

Rivals
      
Its biggest rivals are the other most important Rio clubs: Fluminense, Flamengo, and Vasco da Gama.

The derby with Fluminense is known as the "Clássico Vovô" (Grandfather Derby) because it is the oldest derby in the whole country. Both teams faced each other for the first time in 1905.

The match with Vasco is known as the "Friendship Derby" because the supporters of both club have been friends historically. It is the only derby in the city that tends to be nonviolent.

The derby against Flamengo, "The Rivalry Derby", is the biggest one for the club, and one of the more important in Brazil. The clubs strongly dislike each other and the rivalry goes from the players on the pitch, to the fans, to both clubs' boardrooms. Players who participate in these matches usually become club idols. Some examples include: Garrincha, Manga, Jairzinho, Túlio Maravilha, and more recently Loco Abreu and Jefferson. Manga is known for a remarkable quote about this derby when he used to say that the player's prize money was already guaranteed because it was easy to beat Flamengo. Flamengo's biggest star Zico once said that at his childhood, Botafogo was the club he hated more because the Glorioso used to win all the derbies.

From outside the city, the club has had a historic rivalry with Santos FC since the 1960s.

Symbols

Lone Star
The Lone Star (Estrela Solitária) is currently present in Botafogo's flag and crest. This star was the principal symbol of Club de Regatas Botafogo. After the two Botafogos merged, the Lone Star became one of the most important symbols of Botafogo's football team.

Flag
The old flag of Club de Regatas Botafogo was white with a small black square which contained the Lone Star. The Football Club had a flag with nine black and white stripes with the club's crest localized in the center. Botafogo de Futebol e Regatas then based its flag on that of the two old clubs. The flag has five black and four white stripes, with a black square at the upper left side with the Lone Star.

Uniform
Their primary uniform consists of a black jersey with vertical white stripes, black shorts and grey socks. Their secondary uniform is all white. An all black uniform may also be used. The socks, although traditionally grey, may also be black or even white on rare occasions.

Mascots

Botafogo's mascot is Manequinho, an urinating boy originating from a replica of the Manneken Pis statue that stands near Botafogo's headquarters, which on occasion had a Botafogo jersey put onto by supporters of the team. In 1948 a stray dog named Biriba, known for urinating on the players, was the mascot that led them to the Campeonato Carioca. The first mascot was Donald Duck, who cartoonist Lorenzo Mollas drew in the early 1940s wearing Botafogo's jersey, but was never officially adopted due to rights issues.

Financial situation

In 2006 Botafogo had Supergasbras and Alê as sponsors, the arrangement during that year earned the team $3.2 million (R$7.2 million). The next year, Botafogo managed to sign the sixth highest sponsorship deal in Brazil the new sponsor Liquigás, a Petrobrás subsidiary paid the club $3.9 million (R$7.8 million) under the terms of the one-year contract. In 2008 not only was the agreement with Liquigás renewed for another year, but it also became more lucrative since the sponsorship was raised to around $5 million (R$10.2 million).

In 2007, Botafogo generated the 12th largest amount of revenue for all Brazilian Football clubs— a total $20.8 million (or R$41.1 million) but Botafogo had a net loss of $1.9 million (or R$3.7 million). Also at the end of 2007 Botafogo had total debts of $106.1 million (or R$209.7 million).

However, in more recent years matters have taken a turn for the worse.  The club has suffered various financial crises and a recent report stated that the club had to resort to handouts from benefactors to pay for basic necessities.

Honours

The club has some of Brazilian football's top records, as the most unbeaten matches: 52 games between 1977 and 1978; the matches unbeaten record in the Brazilian Championship games: 42, also between 1977 and 1978; the most player participations in total matches of the Brazil national football team (considering official and unofficial games): 1,094 participations and the most players assigned to the Brazil national team for World Cup.

Chronology of Main Titles

Others 
Taça Brasil South Zone:
 Winners: 1968

Taça Guanabara: 8
 Winners: 1967, 1968, 1997, 2006, 2009, 2010, 2013, 2015

Taça Rio: 9
 Winners: 1975, 1976, 1989, 1997, 2007, 2008, 2010, 2012, 2013

International tournaments
 Tournoi de Paris : (1)  1963
Teresa Herrera Trophy : (1)  1996

Players

Current squad

Botafogo B and Youth Academy

Out on loan

Staff

Current staff

Records

 Note: numbers do not count matches played in Torneio Início.
 Source: RSSSF Brasil – Botafogo

Managers

 Carvalho Leite (1941–42), (1942–43)
 Martim Silveira (1944), (1946)
 Ondino Viera (1947)
 Zezé Moreira (1 January 1948 – 31 December 1948)
 Carvalho Leite (1950–51), (1951–52)
 Sylvio Pirillo (1952)
 Martim Silveira (1952–53)
 Zezé Moreira (1954–55), (1955–56)
 João Saldanha (1957–59)
 Paulo Amaral (1959–61)
 Danilo Alvim (1963)
 Mário Zagallo (1966–70)
 Paulinho de Almeida (1971)
 Paulo Amaral (1973)
 Mário Zagallo (1975)
 Telê Santana (1976)
 Paulo Amaral (1976)
 Othon (1976–78)
 Mário Zagallo (1978)
 Othon (1980)
 Paulinho de Almeida (1981)
 Zé Mário (1 January 1982 – 30 June 1982)
 Mário Zagallo (1986–87)
 Jair Pereira (1988), (1996)
 Valdir Espinosa (1989), (1990–91)
 Othon (1993)
 Valdir Espinosa (1998–99)
 Mauro Fernandes (5 July 1999 – 12 August 1999)
 Carlos Alberto Torres (16 August 1999 – 12 September 1999)
 Antônio Clemente (14 September 1999 – 30 November 1999)
 Joel Santana (1 January 2000 – 7 September 2000)
 Antônio Clemente (8 September 2000 – 21 November 2000)
 Sebastião Lazaroni (27 November 2000 – 11 April 2001)
 Dé Aranha (12 April 2001 – 12 May 2001)
 Paulo Autuori (1 June 2001 – 13 October 2001)
 Abel Braga (14 October 2001 – 8 July 2002)
 Arthur Bernardes (9 July 2002 – 22 August 2002)
 Abel Braga (22 August 2002 – 22 September 2002)
 Ivo Wortmann (22 September 2002 – 9 November 2002)
 Carlos Alberto Torres (9 November 2002 – 19 November 2002)
 Levir Culpi (27 December 2002 – 25 April 2004)
 Mauro Galvão (19 May 2004 – 16 August 2004)
 Paulo Bonamigo (17 August 2004 – 23 March 2005)
 Paulo César Gusmão (26 March 2005 – 30 June 2005)
 Péricles Chamusca (1 July 2005 – 28 August 2005)
 Celso Roth (30 August 2005 – 4 December 2005)
 Carlos Roberto (4 December 2005 – 21 May 2006)
 Cuca (22 May 2006 – 27 September 2007)
 Mário Sérgio (28 September 2007 – 6 October 2007)
 Cuca (7 October 2007 – 29 May 2008)
 Geninho (30 May 2008 – 11 June 2008)
 Ney Franco (11 July 2008 – 10 August 2009)
 Estevam Soares (12 August 2009 – 25 January 2010)
 Joel Santana (26 January 2010 – 22 March 2011)
 Caio Júnior (23 March 2011 – 17 November 2011)
 Oswaldo de Oliveira (2 January 2012 – 9 December 2013)
 Eduardo Hungaro (2 January 2014 – 11 April 2014)
 Vágner Mancini (15 April 2014 – 10 December 2014)
 René Simões (14 December 2014 – 15 July 2015)
 Ricardo Gomes (22 July 2015 – 12 August 2016)
 Jair Ventura (10 May 2016 – 18 December 2017)
 Felipe Conceição (1 January 2018 – 28 February 2018)
 Alberto Valentim (3 March 2018 – 19 June 2018)
 Marcos Paquetá (26 June 2018 – 2 August 2018)
 Zé Ricardo (4 August 2018 – 12 April 2019)
 Eduardo Barroca (15 April 2019 – 6 October 2019)
 Alberto Valentim (14 October 2019 – 9 February 2020)
 Paulo Autuori (13 February 2020 – 1 October 2020)
 Bruno Lazaroni (1 October 2020 – 28 October 2020)
 Ramón Díaz (5 November 2020 – 27 November 2020)
 Eduardo Barroca (27 November 2020 – 6 February 2021)
 Marcelo Chamusca (26 February 2021 – 13 July 2021)
 Enderson Moreira (20 July 2021 – 11 February 2022)
 Luís Castro (25 March 2022 – present)

Notes

Other Sports

Basketball
 Botafogo Basketball

References

External links

 Official Website
 Canal Botafogo
 Vestiario Alvinegro
 Grupo Mais Botafogo
 Botafogo page at Globo
  

 
1904 establishments in Brazil
Association football clubs established in 1904
Football clubs in Rio de Janeiro (city)
Copa CONMEBOL winning clubs
Campeonato Brasileiro Série A winning clubs
Football clubs in Rio de Janeiro (state)